Benjamín Mendoza y Amor Flores (March 31, 1933 – 2014) was a Bolivian surrealist painter who made an  unsuccessful attempt to assassinate Pope Paul VI in Manila in 1970.

Personal life
Mendoza left La Paz, Bolivia, in 1962. From 1962 until 1970, he lived in Argentina, the United States, Japan, Hong Kong and the Philippines. In Argentina, in the early 1960s, he exhibited his work in a few galleries in the San Telmo district of Buenos Aires, and in 1963 illustrated the book Todo estaba sucio by Raúl Barón Biza. He also made two murals for the Manila Hotel in Mar del Plata, which no longer exist. He then exhibited in the Soviet Union, Hawaii, and after that moved to the Philippines.

Assassination attempt
On November 27, 1970, at approximately 9:30 in the morning, Mendoza, dressed as a priest and with crucifix in hand, managed to approach the Pope who had just disembarked from his chartered DC-8 jet at Manila International Airport. Mendoza stabbed the pontiff twice in the neck with a kris (a short, wavy dagger), hitting him on either side of the jugular vein. On both sides of the weapon was the inscription "bullets, superstitions, flags, kingdoms, garbage, armies and shit."

The private secretary of Pope Paul VI, Pasquale Macchi, reduced the damage by blocking the aggressor's arm. In addition, the Pope was wearing a rigid collar to relieve pain from cervical spondylosis, another factor that lightened his wounds. Suffering only slight injuries to his chest, the Pope continued his official visit according to the planned program. The fact that he was wounded at all was not revealed until after his death in 1978.

Mendoza was then subdued by monsignors Macchi and Paul Marcinkus and was subsequently arrested. Mendoza, who said during his trial "I will save mankind from superstition", was convicted of attempted murder.

Life after prison
While Mendoza was in prison, a gallery owner ordered a series of his paintings for an exhibition. The paintings were sold in their entirety.

After serving a 38-month prison sentence in the Philippines, Mendoza was released on bail of £533 (approximately US$700) and deported to Bolivia in 1974. Upon regaining his freedom, he organized several exhibitions in more than 80 countries, living in Lima. When asked about his attempt to assassinate Pope Paul VI, he said he simply wanted to attract attention. According to filmmaker Armando Bó, who made contact with Mendoza, he acted in a "moment of madness".

Bibliography
 Sergio Campailla, Wanted. Benjamín Mendoza y Amor. Il pittore che attentò alla vita di papa Paolo VI, Marsilio, Venezia 2016.

References

External links
 http://journals.openedition.org/amerika/6479
 https://coconuts.co/manila/features/man-who-tried-kill-pope-paul-vi-manila/

1933 births
2014 deaths
1970 crimes in the Philippines
Bolivian painters
Failed assassins
People from La Paz
People convicted of attempted murder
Bolivian people imprisoned abroad
Prisoners and detainees of the Philippines
20th century in Manila